Buckingham Archeological Site is an archaeological site near Berlin in Worcester County, Maryland.  It is one of the few known Woodland period village sites in the coastal marsh areas of the Atlantic Coast section of Maryland. The site falls within the general vicinity of an Assateague Indian town. It is located four miles east of the Sandy Point Site, both including the southernmost reported occurrence of Townsend Series ceramics on the coastal section of the Eastern Shore.

It was listed on the National Register of Historic Places in 1975.

References

External links
, including photo from 1974, at Maryland Historical Trust

Archaeological sites in Worcester County, Maryland
Archaeological sites on the National Register of Historic Places in Maryland
Native American history of Maryland
Woodland period
National Register of Historic Places in Worcester County, Maryland